Chubba Purdy (born Preston Purdy; July 30, 2001) is an American football quarterback who plays college football for Nebraska. He originally committed and played for Florida State before transferring. He is the younger brother of current San Francisco 49ers quarterback Brock Purdy.

Early life and high school career 
Purdy was born on July 30, 2001, in Queen Creek, Arizona. He attended and played football for Perry High School in Gilbert, Arizona. In his two years as a starter he threw for over 9,000 yards of total offense and 111 touchdowns. 

In Purdy's first two seasons he sat behind his older brother Brock. As a junior he threw for 3,425 and 36 touchdowns while also rushing for 1,152 yards and 23 rushing touchdowns. Lead Perry to an 11–3 record and a 6A state championship game appearance which ended in a 28–65 loss against Chandler.

As a senior in 2019 Purdy tallied 4,423 yards of total offense and 52 touchdowns. He was named as the Arizona Offensive Player of the Year. He helped lead Perry to the quarterfinals of the 6A state playoffs. The team would lose to Desert Vista 63–70.

College career

Florida State 
On June 21, 2019, Purdy committed to play college football for Louisville but on December 18, 2019, he flipped his commitment to Florida State.

As a true freshman in 2020, Purdy appeared in three games and started once. He finished the season 27 of 53 for 219 yards and two touchdowns. He also added 57 yards rushing on nineteen attempts. He became just the fifth true freshman in Florida State history to start at quarterback. He made his college debut against Louisville, he gained eight yards on two carries. He made his first collegiate start against NC State, he went fifteen of 23 for 181 yards and two touchdowns while also adding 54 rushing yards on twelve attempts before being pulled in the second quarter for fellow freshman Tate Rodemaker. He threw his first career touchdown pass on a 69-yard throw to Ontaria Wilson. He also appeared against Pittsburgh after starter Jordan Travis left the game at halftime due to injury and after backup James Blackman struggled, he finished the game twelve of 21 for 38 yards.

As a redshirt freshman in 2021, Purdy only appeared against UMass in the team's 59–3 win. He completed all five of his pass attempts for 98 yards and a career-high-tying two touchdown passes. On November 3, 2021 he entered the transfer portal.

Nebraska 
On January 17, 2022, Purdy transferred to Nebraska. He made his debut for Nebraska against No. 6 Oklahoma. He lead the team to one of its two touchdown drives as he went seven of eleven for 35 yards while also rushing five times for 29 yards, including an eight-yard score. He also played sparingly against Indiana and Rutgers before playing the entire second have against No. 17 Illinois. Against Illinois he completed three of eight passes for fifteen yards while injured. He made his first career start against Minnesota while starter Casey Thompson dealt with injury. In the first quarter he would account for 65 total yards of offense and a rushing touchdown for a 10-point first quarter. Purdy would start for the second consecutive week against No. 3 Michigan, finishing the game as the team's leading passer and runner despite being knocked out of the game with a season-ending injury. He completed 50% of his passes going six of twelve for 56 yards with 39 yards on the ground. His season officially ended after undergoing surgery for his collarbone.

Statistics

Personal life 
Purdy is the son of Shawn and Carrie Purdy. His older brother, Brock, played quarterback for Iowa State before being drafted as Mr. Irrelevant in the 2022 NFL Draft by the San Francisco 49ers of the National Football League (NFL). His older sister, Whittney, played softball for Southeastern. Purdy's father, Shawn, played baseball with Miami and in the minor leagues.

References

External links 
 Florida State Seminoles bio
 Nebraska Cornhuskers bio

2001 births
Living people
American football quarterbacks
Florida State Seminoles football players
Nebraska Cornhuskers football players
People from Gilbert, Arizona
Players of American football from Arizona
Sportspeople from the Phoenix metropolitan area